Ernest Charles Deadmarsh (born April 5, 1950) is a Canadian former ice hockey left wing. Deadmarsh was drafted in the second round, 15th overall, of the 1970 NHL Amateur Draft by the Buffalo Sabres. He played in the National Hockey League for the Sabres, Atlanta Flames, and Kansas City Scouts. He also played in the World Hockey Association for the Vancouver Blazers, Calgary Cowboys, Minnesota Fighting Saints, Edmonton Oilers, and Cincinnati Stingers. He is a second cousin of former NHL player Adam Deadmarsh.

In his NHL career, Deadmarsh played in 137 games, scoring twelve goals and adding five assists. He played in 255 WHA games, scoring 63 goals and adding 66 assists.

Career statistics

Regular season and playoffs

External links

1950 births
Living people
Atlanta Flames players
Brandon Wheat Kings players
Buffalo Sabres draft picks
Buffalo Sabres players
Calgary Cowboys players
Canadian ice hockey left wingers
Cincinnati Stingers players
Cincinnati Swords players
Edmonton Oilers (WHA) players
Ice hockey people from British Columbia
Kansas City Scouts players
Kelowna Buckaroos players
Minnesota Fighting Saints players
Salt Lake Golden Eagles (WHL) players
Sportspeople from Trail, British Columbia
Vancouver Blazers players